The 2021 World Triathlon Duathlon Championships was a duathlon competition held in Avilés, Spain from 6 to 7 November 2021 and organized by World Triathlon. The Elite and U23 races consisted of a  run,  bike and  run. The championship also included other races per age group, junior, sprint per age group and para-duathlon.

Results
In the women's Elite race, Venezuelan Joselyn Brea, competing under World Triathlon flag, won her first world championship. French Nathan Guerbeur won his second consecutive title in the men's Elite edition.

Men

Women

References

External links
Official event website
Complete Results for 2021 Duathlon World Championships

World Championships
International sports competitions hosted by Spain
Triathlon competitions in Spain
World Triathlon Duathlon Championships
World Triathlon Duathlon Championships